Rigel is a blue supergiant star in the constellation of Orion. It has the Bayer designation β Orionis, which is Latinized to Beta Orionis and abbreviated Beta Ori or β Ori. Rigel is the brightest and most massive componentand the eponymof a star system of at least four stars that appear as a single blue-white point of light to the naked eye.

A star of spectral type B8Ia, Rigel is calculated to be anywhere from 61,500 to 363,000 times as luminous as the Sun, and 18 to 24 times as massive, depending on the method and assumptions used. Due to its stellar wind, Rigel's mass-loss is estimated to be ten million times that of the Sun. With an estimated age of seven to nine million years, Rigel has exhausted its core hydrogen fuel, expanded, and cooled to become a supergiant. It is expected to end its life as a typeII supernova, leaving a neutron star or a black hole as a final remnant, depending on the initial mass of the star.

Rigel varies slightly in brightness, its apparent magnitude ranging from 0.05 to 0.18. It is classified as an Alpha Cygni variable due to the amplitude and periodicity of its brightness variation, as well as its spectral type. Its intrinsic variability is caused by pulsations in its unstable atmosphere. Rigel is generally the seventh-brightest star in the night sky and the brightest star in Orion, though it is occasionally outshone by Betelgeuse, which varies over a larger range.

It has an apparent magnitude of 6.7, making it 1/400th as bright as Rigel. Two stars in the system can be seen by large telescopes, and the brighter of the two is a spectroscopic binary. These three stars are all blue-white main-sequence stars, each three to four times as massive as the Sun. Rigel and the triple system orbit a common center of gravity with a period estimated to be 24,000 years. The inner stars of the triple system orbit each other every 10 days, and the outer star orbits the inner pair every 63 years. A much fainter star, separated from Rigel and the others by nearly an arc minute, may be part of the same star system.

Nomenclature 

In 2016, the International Astronomical Union (IAU) included the name "Rigel" in the IAU Catalog of Star Names. According to the IAU, this proper name applies only to the primary component A of the Rigel system. In historical astronomical catalogs, the system is listed variously as HII33, Σ668, β555, or ADS3823. For simplicity, Rigel's companions are referred to as Rigel B, C, and D; the IAU describes such names as "useful nicknames" that are "unofficial". In modern comprehensive catalogs, the whole multiple star system is known as WDS 05145-0812 or CCDM 05145–0812.

The designation of Rigel as β Orionis (Latinized to Beta Orionis) was made by Johann Bayer in 1603. The "beta" designation is commonly given to the second-brightest star in each constellation, but Rigel is almost always brighter than α Orionis (Betelgeuse). Astronomer James B. Kaler has speculated that Rigel was designated by Bayer during a rare period when it was outshone by the variable star Betelgeuse, resulting in the latter star being designated "alpha" and Rigel designated "beta". Bayer did not strictly order the stars by brightness, instead grouping them by magnitude. Rigel and Betelgeuse were both considered to be of the first magnitude class, and in Orion the stars of each class are thought to have been ordered north to south. Rigel is included in the General Catalogue of Variable Stars, but since it already has a Bayer designation it has no separate variable star designation.

Rigel has many other stellar designations taken from various catalogs, including the Flamsteed designation 19Orionis (19 Ori), the Bright Star Catalogue entry HR1713, and the Henry Draper Catalogue number HD34085. These designations frequently appear in the scientific literature, but rarely in popular writing.

Observation 

Rigel is an intrinsic variable star with an apparent magnitude ranging from 0.05 to 0.18. It is typically the seventh-brightest star in the celestial sphere, excluding the Sun, although occasionally fainter than Betelgeuse. It is fainter than Capella, which may also vary slightly in brightness. Rigel appears slightly blue-white and has a B-V color index of −0.06. It contrasts strongly with reddish Betelgeuse.

Culminating every year at midnight on 12 December, and at 9:00pm on 24 January, Rigel is visible on winter evenings in the Northern Hemisphere and on summer evenings in the Southern Hemisphere. In the Southern Hemisphere, Rigel is the first bright star of Orion visible as the constellation rises. Correspondingly it is also the first star of Orion to set in most of the Northern Hemisphere. The star is a vertex of the "Winter Hexagon", an asterism that includes Aldebaran, Capella, Pollux, Procyon, and Sirius. Rigel is a prominent equatorial navigation star, being easily located and readily visible in all the world's oceans (the exception is the area north of the 82nd parallel north).

Spectroscopy 

Rigel's spectral type is a defining point of the classification sequence for supergiants. The overall spectrum is typical for a late B class star, with strong absorption lines of the hydrogen Balmer series as well as neutral helium lines and some of heavier elements such as oxygen, calcium, and magnesium. The luminosity class for B8 stars is estimated from the strength and narrowness of the hydrogen spectral lines, and Rigel is assigned to the bright supergiant class Ia. Variations in the spectrum have resulted in the assignment of different classes to Rigel, such as B8 Ia, B8 Iab, and B8 Iae.

As early as 1888, the heliocentric radial velocity of Rigel, as estimated from the Doppler shifts of its spectral lines, was seen to vary. This was confirmed and interpreted at the time as being due to a spectroscopic companion with a period of about 22 days.

This is now known as a P Cygni profile after a star that shows this feature strongly in its spectrum. It is associated with mass loss where there is simultaneously emission from a dense wind close to the star and absorption from circumstellar material expanding away from the star.

The unusual Hα line profile is observed to vary unpredictably. Around a third of the time it is a normal absorption line. About a quarter of the time it is a double-peaked line, that is, an absorption line with an emission core or an emission line with an absorption core. About a quarter of the time it has a P Cygni profile; most of the rest of the time the line has an inverse P Cygni profile, where the emission component is on the short wavelength side of the line. Rarely, there is a pure emission Hα line. The line profile changes are interpreted as variations in the quantity and velocity of material being expelled from the star. Occasional very high-velocity outflows have been inferred, and, more rarely, infalling material. The overall picture is one of large looping structures arising from the photosphere and driven by magnetic fields.

Variability 

Rigel has been known to vary in brightness since at least 1930. The small amplitude of Rigel's brightness variation requires photoelectric or CCD photometry to be reliably detected. This brightness variation has no obvious period. Observations over 18 nights in 1984 showed variations at red, blue, and yellow wavelengths of up to 0.13 magnitudes on timescales of a few hours to several days, but again no clear period. Rigel's color index varies slightly, but this is not significantly correlated with its brightness variations.

From analysis of Hipparcos satellite photometry, Rigel is identified as belonging to the Alpha Cygni class of variable stars, defined as "non-radially pulsating supergiants of the Bep–AepIa spectral types". In those spectral types, the 'e' indicates that it displays emission lines in its spectrum, while the 'p' means it has an unspecified spectral peculiarity. Alpha Cygni type variables are generally considered to be irregular or have quasi-periods. Rigel was added to the General Catalogue of Variable Stars in the 74th name-list of variable stars on the basis of the Hipparcos photometry, which showed variations with a photographic amplitude of 0.039 magnitudes and a possible period of 2.075 days. Rigel was observed with the Canadian MOST satellite for nearly 28 days in 2009. Milli-magnitude variations were observed, and gradual changes in flux suggest the presence of long-period pulsation modes.

Mass loss 

From observations of the variable Hα spectral line, Rigel's mass-loss rate due to stellar wind is estimated be  solar masses per year (/yr)—about ten million times more than the mass-loss rate from the Sun. More detailed optical and Kband infrared spectroscopic observations, together with VLTI interferometry, were taken from 2006 to 2010. Analysis of the Hα and Hγ line profiles, and measurement of the regions producing the lines, show that Rigel's stellar wind varies greatly in structure and strength. Loop and arm structures were also detected within the wind. It is estimated that Rigel has lost about three solar masses since beginning life as a star of  seven to nine million years ago.

Distance 

Rigel's distance from the Sun is somewhat uncertain, different estimates being obtained by different methods. However, the measurements for this object may be unreliable.

Indirect distance estimation methods have also been employed. For example, Rigel is believed to be in a region of nebulosity, its radiation illuminating several nearby clouds. From measures of other nebula-embedded stars, IC2118's distance is estimated to be .

Rigel is thought to be considerably closer than most of the members of Orion OB1 and the Orion Nebula. Betelgeuse and Saiph lie at a similar distance to Rigel, although Betelgeuse is a runaway star with a complex history and might have originally formed in the main body of the association.

Stellar system 

Hierarchical scheme for Rigel's components

The star system of which Rigel is a part has at least four components. Rigel (sometimes called Rigel A to distinguish from the other components) has a visual companion, which is likely a close triple-star system. A fainter star at a wider separation might be a fifth component of the Rigel system.

William Herschel discovered Rigel to be a visual double star on 1 October 1781, cataloguing it as star 33 in the "second class of double stars" in his Catalogue of Double Stars, usually abbreviated to HII33, or as H233 in the Washington Double Star Catalogue. Friedrich Georg Wilhelm von Struve first measured the relative position of the companion in 1822, cataloguing the visual pair as Σ 668. The secondary star is often referred to as Rigel B or β Orionis B. The angular separation of Rigel B from Rigel A is 9.5 arc seconds to its south along position angle 204°.

At Rigel's estimated distance, Rigel B's projected separation from Rigel A is over 2,200astronomical units (AU). Since its discovery, there has been no sign of orbital motion, although both stars share a similar common proper motion. The pair would have an estimated orbital period of 24,000years. There is no parallax for Rigel in Gaia DR2. The Gaia DR2 proper motions for Rigel B and the Hipparcos proper motions for Rigel are both small, although not quite the same.

In 1871, Sherburne Wesley Burnham suspected Rigel B to be a binary system, and in 1878, he resolved it into two components. Their estimated orbital period is 63years. Burnham listed the Rigel multiple system as β555 in his double star catalog or BU555 in modern use.

Component B is a double-lined spectroscopic binary system, which shows two sets of spectral lines combined within its single stellar spectrum. Periodic changes observed in relative positions of these lines indicate an orbital period of 9.86days. The two spectroscopic components Rigel Ba and Rigel Bb cannot be resolved in optical telescopes but are known to both be hot stars of spectral type around B9. This spectroscopic binary, together with the close visual component Rigel C, is likely a physical triple-star system, although Rigel C cannot be detected in the spectrum, which is inconsistent with its observed brightness.

In 1878, Burnham found another possibly associated star of approximately 13th magnitude. He listed it as component D of β555, although it is unclear whether it is physically related or a coincidental alignment. Gaia DR2 finds it to be a 12th magnitude sunlike star at approximately the same distance as Rigel. Likely a K-type main-sequence star, this star would have an orbital period of around 250,000 years, if it is part of the Rigel system. A spectroscopic companion to Rigel was reported on the basis of radial velocity variations, and its orbit was even calculated, but subsequent work suggests the star does not exist and that observed pulsations are intrinsic to Rigel itself.

Physical characteristics 

Rigel is a blue supergiant that has exhausted the hydrogen fuel in its core, expanded and cooled as it moved away from the main sequence across the upper part of the Hertzsprung–Russell diagram. Rigel's complex variability at visual wavelengths is caused by stellar pulsations similar to those of Deneb. Further observations of radial velocity variations indicate that it simultaneously oscillates in at least 19 non-radial modes with periods ranging from about 1.2 to 74 days.

Estimation of many physical characteristics of blue supergiant stars, including Rigel, is challenging due to their rarity and uncertainty about how far they are from the Sun. As such, their characteristics are mainly estimated from theoretical stellar evolution models.

Although Rigel is often considered the most luminous star within 1,000 light-years of the Sun, its energy output is poorly known.

Due to their closeness to each other and ambiguity of the spectrum, little is known about the intrinsic properties of the members of the Rigel BC triple system. All three stars seem to be near equally hot B-type main-sequence stars that are three to four times as massive as the Sun.

Evolution 

Stellar evolution models suggest the pulsations of Rigel are powered by nuclear reactions in a hydrogen-burning shell that is at least partially non-convective. These pulsations are stronger and more numerous in stars that have evolved through a red supergiant phase and then increased in temperature to again become a blue supergiant. This is due to the decreased mass and increased levels of fusion products at the surface of the star.

Rigel is likely to be fusing helium in its core. Due to strong convection of helium produced in the core while Rigel was on the main sequence and in the hydrogen-burning shell since it became a supergiant, the fraction of helium at the surface has increased from 26.6% when the star formed to 32% now. The surface abundances of carbon, nitrogen, and oxygen seen in the spectrum are compatible with a post-red supergiant star only if its internal convection zones are modeled using non-homogeneous chemical conditions known as the Ledoux Criteria.

Rigel is expected to eventually end its stellar life as a type II supernova. The supernova would leave behind either a black hole or a neutron star.

Etymology and cultural significance 

The earliest known recording of the name Rigel is in the Alfonsine tables of 1521. It is derived from the Arabic name , "the left leg (foot) of Jauzah" (i.e. rijl meaning "leg, foot"), which can be traced to the 10th century. The Alphonsine tables saw its name split into "Rigel" and "Algebar", with the note, et dicitur Algebar. Nominatur etiam Rigel. Alternate spellings from the 17th century include Regel by Italian astronomer Giovanni Battista Riccioli, Riglon by German astronomer Wilhelm Schickard, and Rigel Algeuze or Algibbar by English scholar Edmund Chilmead.

With the constellation representing the mythological Greek huntsman Orion, Rigel is his knee or (as its name suggests) foot; with the nearby star Beta Eridani marking Orion's footstool. Rigel is presumably the star known as "Aurvandil's toe" in Norse mythology. In the Caribbean, Rigel represented the severed leg of the folkloric figure Trois Rois, himself represented by the three stars of Orion's Belt. The leg had been severed with a cutlass by the maiden Bįhi (Sirius). The Lacandon people of southern Mexico knew it as tunsel ("little woodpecker").

Rigel was known as Yerrerdet-kurrk to the Wotjobaluk koori of southeastern Australia, and held to be the mother-in-law of Totyerguil (Altair). The distance between them signified the taboo preventing a man from approaching his mother-in-law. The indigenous Boorong people of northwestern Victoria named Rigel as Collowgullouric Warepil. The Wardaman people of northern Australia know Rigel as the Red Kangaroo Leader Unumburrgu and chief conductor of ceremonies in a songline when Orion is high in the sky. Eridanus, the river, marks a line of stars in the sky leading to it, and the other stars of Orion are his ceremonial tools and entourage. Betelgeuse is Ya-jungin "Owl Eyes Flicking", watching the ceremonies.

The Māori people of New Zealand named Rigel as Puanga, said to be a daughter of Rehua (Antares), the chief of all-stars. Its heliacal rising presages the appearance of Matariki (the Pleiades) in the dawn sky, marking the Māori New Year in late May or early June. The Moriori people of the Chatham Islands, as well as some Maori groups in New Zealand, mark the start of their New Year with Rigel rather than the Pleiades. Puaka is a southern name variant used in the South Island.

In Japan, the Minamoto or Genji clan chose Rigel and its white color as its symbol, calling the star Genji-boshi, while the Taira or Heike clan adopted Betelgeuse and its red color. The two powerful families fought the Genpei War; the stars were seen as facing off against each other and kept apart only by the three stars of Orion's Belt.

In modern culture 

The MS Rigel was originally a Norwegian ship, built in Copenhagen in 1924. It was requisitioned by the Germans during World War II and sunk in 1944 while being used to transport prisoners of war. Two US Navy ships have borne the name USS Rigel. The SSM-N-6 Rigel was a cruise missile program for the US Navy that was cancelled in 1953 before reaching deployment.

The Rigel Skerries are a chain of small islands in Antarctica, renamed after originally being called Utskjera. They were given their current name as Rigel was used as an astrofix. Mount Rigel, elevation , is also in Antarctica.

Due to its brightness and its recognizable name, Rigel is also a popular fixture in science fiction. Fictional depictions of Rigel can be found in Star Trek, The Hitchhiker's Guide to the Galaxy, The Simpsons and many more books, films, and games.

See also 
 Orion (Chinese astronomy)

Notes

References

External links 

 
 
 December double star of the monthbeta Orionis Astronomical Society of Southern Africa
 My Favorite Double Star AAVSO

B-type supergiants
B-type main-sequence stars
Alpha Cygni variables
Multiple star systems

Orion (constellation)
Arabic words and phrases
Orionis, Beta
BD-08 1063
Orionis, 19
034085
024436
Stars named from the Arabic language